There were a number of mints in Scotland, for the production of the Scottish coinage. The most important mint was in the capital, Edinburgh, which was active from the reign of David I (1124–1153), and was the last to close, in the 19th century.

Carlisle was probably the first Scottish mint in 1136. According to Bateson, David I began to mint coins after capturing the city. Mints at Bamburgh and Corbridge in Northumberland, under the control of David's son Henry, Earl of Northumberland, later returned to English control. Under Alexander III (1249–1286) there were 16 mints. In the reign of James IV (1488–1513), the sole mint was located at Edinburgh. After this time, the only other active mint was at Stirling, where bawbees were minted under Queen Mary.

Until 1559 a mint was in the grounds of Holyrood House in Edinburgh. From 1559 to 1574 the mint was located within the confines of Edinburgh Castle for security reasons. In 1570 Regent Morton coined base money at Dalkeith Castle at three times its base value, and used this to pay for various building projects for the Crown, including works at Edinburgh Castle, but in 1575 devalued the currency to its base value to the anger of those still holding it.

From 1574 until 1707 the mint in Edinburgh was located on the Cowgate at the foot of South Grays Close, east of Cardinal David Beaton's lodging. The buildings became the property of the mint master Thomas Acheson. The site, near the Cowgate, is now commemorated by the street name "Coinyie House Close".

Minting ceased in Scotland in 1709 when the Edinburgh Mint produced its last batch of coins at the end of the 1707–1710 Scottish recoinage, although it retained its permanent officials (though not other staff) for a further hundred years, until 1814. The mint was finally abolished in 1817 and sold in 1830. The title of 'Governor of the Mint of Scotland', which passed to the Chancellor of the Exchequer under the Coinage Act 1870, was finally abolished with the passing of the Coinage Act 1971.

The building which had held the mint on the Cowgate in Edinburgh was demolished in 1877.

Mints

References

Bibliography
 
 Donald Bateson. Scottish Coins. Shire Publications Ltd., Bucks, 1987, 
 James Mackay – John Mussel (eds.): Coin Price Guide to British coins, Token Publishing Ltd, Axminster, Devon
 Ian Halley Stewart. The Scottish Coinage, Spink & Son, London, 1955

Currencies of Scotland
Economic history of Scotland
Coins of Scotland
Scotland
Scottish exchequer